Snežana Rodić (born 19 August 1982) is a Slovenian triple jumper.

She was born Snežana Vukmirović and married Aleksandar Rodić; she is variously referred to as  Snežana Rodič, Snežana Rodić, Snežana Vukmirovič.

Achievements

References

1982 births
Living people
Slovenian female triple jumpers
Mediterranean Games silver medalists for Slovenia
Mediterranean Games medalists in athletics
Athletes (track and field) at the 2005 Mediterranean Games
Athletes (track and field) at the 2013 Mediterranean Games